The Shape Of Things To Come... is the first EP released by the metal band My Ruin. It includes the song "Made To Measure" from the following album, The Horror of Beauty, in both its original version and a radio edit.

Track listing
 "Made to Measure"
 "Grotesque"
 "Unmanageable"
 "Sex Junkie" (Plasmatics cover)
 "Made to Measure" (radio edit)

Extra content
When the CD is played on a computer, there is the option to watch a 13-minute short film directed by Tairrie B about the band. The video includes interviews with all band members, studio footage from the making of the new album, The Horror of Beauty, and a couple of live clips.

Personnel
 Tairrie B - vocals
 Mick Murphy - guitars, producer on tracks 1, 2 and 4
 Meghan Mattex - bass guitar
 Yael - drums 
 Nick Raskulinecz - producer, engineer and mixer on track 3
 Todd Osenbrugh - producer and engineer on tracks 1, 2, and 4
 Roger Lian - mastering

My Ruin albums
2003 debut EPs
Albums produced by Nick Raskulinecz